Pim is a Dutch masculine given name, which is a diminutive of the name Willem. The name may refer to:

 Pim Balkestein (born 1987), Dutch football player
 Pim Bekkering (1931–2014), Dutch football player
 Pim van Boetzelaer van Oosterhout (1892–1986), Dutch diplomat and politician
 Pim Bouwman (born 1991), Dutch football player
 Pim Doesburg (1943–2020), Dutch football player
 Pim Fortuyn (1948–2002), Dutch politician
 Pim Jacobs (1934–1996), Dutch jazz pianist
 Pim-Pim Johansson (born 1982), Swedish tennis player
 Pim Jungerius (born 1933), Dutch physical geographer
 Pim Koopman (1953–2009), Dutch musician
 Pim Lier (1918–2015), Dutch lawyer and jurist
 Pim van Lommel (born 1943), Dutch cardiologist and scientist
 Pim Ligthart (born 1988), Dutch cyclist
 Pim van de Meent (born 1937), Dutch football player
 Pim Mulier (1865–1954), Dutch sportsperson
 Pim Nieuwenhuis (born 1976), Dutch sailor
 Pim de la Parra (born 1940), Surinamese-Dutch filmmaker
 Pim Rietbroek (born 1942), Dutch handball player and coach
 Pim Verbeek (1956–2019), Dutch football coach
 Pim Walsma (born 1987), Dutch baseball player

References

Dutch masculine given names